The Embassy of Lesotho in Washington, D.C. is the diplomatic mission of the Kingdom of Lesotho to the United States. It is located at 2511 Massachusetts Avenue, Northwest, Washington, D.C., in the Embassy Row neighborhood.

The Ambassador is Gabriel Sankatana Maja.

References

External links
 
Official website

Lesotho
Washington, D.C.
Lesotho–United States relations
Lesotho